Agonidium milloti is a species of ground beetle in the subfamily Platyninae. It was described by Jeannel in 1948.

References

milloti
Beetles described in 1948